Mike Bickle may refer to:

 Mike Bickle (minister) (born 1955), American evangelical Christian leader
 Mike Bickle (footballer) (born 1944), English former footballer
 Michael Bickle (born 1948), British Earth scientist